Peder I. Ramsrud (10 February 1923 – 10 June 2014) was a Norwegian politician for the Progress Party.

He was born in Fåberg in February 1923.

Ramsrud was elected to the Norwegian Parliament from Oppland in 1989, but was not re-elected in 1993. He was a member of Østre Toten municipality council from 1977 to 1985. From 1981 to 1991 he held various positions in Oppland county council.

References

1923 births
2014 deaths
Progress Party (Norway) politicians
Members of the Storting
20th-century Norwegian politicians